Many mathematical problems have been stated but not yet solved. These problems come from many areas of mathematics, such as theoretical physics, computer science, algebra, analysis, combinatorics, algebraic, differential, discrete and Euclidean geometries, graph theory, group theory, model theory, number theory, set theory, Ramsey theory, dynamical systems, and partial differential equations. Some problems belong to more than one discipline and are studied using techniques from different areas. Prizes are often awarded for the solution to a long-standing problem, and some lists of unsolved problems, such as the Millennium Prize Problems, receive considerable attention.

This list is a composite of notable unsolved problems mentioned in previously published lists, including but not limited to lists considered authoritative. Although this list may never be comprehensive, the problems listed here vary widely in both difficulty and importance.

Lists of unsolved problems in mathematics 
Various mathematicians and organizations have published and promoted lists of unsolved mathematical problems. In some cases, the lists have been associated with prizes for the discoverers of solutions.

Millennium Prize Problems 
Of the original seven Millennium Prize Problems listed by the Clay Mathematics Institute in 2000, six remain unsolved to date:

 Birch and Swinnerton-Dyer conjecture
 Hodge conjecture
 Navier–Stokes existence and smoothness
 P versus NP
 Riemann hypothesis
 Yang–Mills existence and mass gap

The seventh problem, the Poincaré conjecture, was solved by Grigori Perelman in 2003. However, a generalization called the smooth four-dimensional Poincaré conjecture—that is, whether a four-dimensional topological sphere can have two or more inequivalent smooth structures—is unsolved.

Unsolved problems

Algebra 

 Birch–Tate conjecture on the relation between the order of the center of the Steinberg group of the ring of integers of a number field to the field's Dedekind zeta function.
 Bombieri–Lang conjectures on densities of rational points of algebraic surfaces and algebraic varieties defined on number fields and their field extensions.
 Connes embedding problem in Von Neumann algebra theory
 Determinantal conjecture on the determinant of the sum of two normal matrices.
 Eilenberg–Ganea conjecture: a group with cohomological dimension 2 also has a 2-dimensional Eilenberg–MacLane space .
 Farrell–Jones conjecture on whether certain assembly maps are isomorphisms.
 Bost conjecture: a specific case of the Farrell–Jones conjecture
 Finite lattice representation problem: is every finite lattice isomorphic to the congruence lattice of some finite algebra?
 Goncharov conjecture on the cohomology of certain motivic complexes.
 Green's conjecture: the Clifford index of a non-hyperelliptic curve is determined by the extent to which it, as a canonical curve, has linear syzygies.
 Grothendieck–Katz p-curvature conjecture: a conjectured local–global principle for linear ordinary differential equations.
 Hadamard conjecture: for every positive integer , a Hadamard matrix of order  exists.
 Williamson conjecture: the problem of finding Williamson matrices, which can be used to construct Hadamard matrices.
 Hadamard's maximal determinant problem: what is the largest determinant of a matrix with entries all equal to 1 or –1?
 Hilbert's fifteenth problem: put Schubert calculus on a rigorous foundation.
 Hilbert's sixteenth problem: what are the possible configurations of the connected components of M-curves?
 Homological conjectures in commutative algebra
 Jacobson's conjecture: the intersection of all powers of the Jacobson radical of a left-and-right Noetherian ring is precisely 0.
 Kaplansky's conjectures
 Monomial conjecture on Noetherian local rings
 Existence of perfect cuboids and associated cuboid conjectures
 Pierce–Birkhoff conjecture: every piecewise-polynomial  is the maximum of a finite set of minimums of finite collections of polynomials.
 Sendov's conjecture: if a complex polynomial with degree at least  has all roots in the closed unit disk, then each root is within distance  from some critical point.
 Serre's conjecture II: if  is a simply connected semisimple algebraic group over a perfect field of cohomological dimension at most , then the Galois cohomology set  is zero.
 Serre's multiplicity conjectures
 Uniform boundedness conjecture for rational points: do algebraic curves of genus  over number fields  have at most some bounded number  of -rational points?
 Wild problems: problems involving classification of pairs of  matrices under simultaneous conjugation.
 Zauner's conjecture: do SIC-POVMs exist in all dimensions?

Representation theory 
 Arthur's conjectures
 Dade's conjecture relating the numbers of characters of blocks of a finite group to the numbers of characters of blocks of local subgroups.
 Demazure conjecture on representations of algebraic groups over the integers.
 Kazhdan–Lusztig conjectures relating the values of the Kazhdan–Lusztig polynomials at 1 with representations of complex semisimple Lie groups and Lie algebras.
 McKay conjecture: in a group , the number of irreducible complex characters of degree not divisible by a prime number  is equal to the number of irreducible complex characters of the normalizer of any Sylow -subgroup within .

Notebook problems 
 The Dniester Notebook lists several hundred unsolved problems in algebra, particularly ring theory and modulus theory.
 The Erlagol Notebook lists unsolved problems in algebra and model theory.

Analysis 

 The Brennan conjecture: estimating the integral of powers of the moduli of the derivative of conformal maps into the open unit disk, on certain subsets of 
 The four exponentials conjecture: the transcendence of at least one of four exponentials of combinations of irrationals
 Goodman's conjecture on the coefficients of multivalent functions
 Invariant subspace problem – does every bounded operator on a complex Banach space send some non-trivial closed subspace to itself?
 Kung–Traub conjecture on the optimal order of a multipoint iteration without memory
 Lehmer's conjecture on the Mahler measure of non-cyclotomic polynomials
 The Pompeiu problem on the topology of domains for which some nonzero function has integrals that vanish over every congruent copy
 Schanuel's conjecture on the transcendence degree of exponentials of linearly independent irrationals

 Are  (the Euler–Mascheroni constant),, Catalan's constant, or Khinchin's constant rational, algebraic irrational, or transcendental? What is the irrationality measure of each of these numbers?
 What is the exact value of Landau's constants, including Bloch's constant?
 How are suspended infinite-infinitesimals paradoxes justified?

 Regularity of solutions of Euler equations
 Convergence of Flint Hills series
 Regularity of solutions of Vlasov–Maxwell equations

Combinatorics 

 The 1/3–2/3 conjecture – does every finite partially ordered set that is not totally ordered contain two elements x and y such that the probability that x appears before y in a random linear extension is between 1/3 and 2/3?
 The Dittert conjecture concerning the maximum achieved by a particular function of matrices with real, nonnegative entries satisfying a summation condition
 Problems in Latin squares – open questions concerning Latin squares
 The lonely runner conjecture – if  runners with pairwise distinct speeds run round a track of unit length, will every runner be "lonely" (that is, be at least a distance  from each other runner) at some time?
 Map folding – various problems in map folding and stamp folding.
 No-three-in-line problem – how many points can be placed in the  grid so that no three of them lie on a line?
 Rudin's conjecture on the number of squares in finite arithmetic progressions
 Frankl's union-closed sets conjecture – for any family of sets closed under sums there exists an element (of the underlying space) belonging to half or more of the sets

 Give a combinatorial interpretation of the Kronecker coefficients
 The values of the Dedekind numbers  for 
 The values of the Ramsey numbers, particularly 
 The values of the Van der Waerden numbers
 Finding a function to model n-step self-avoiding walks

Dynamical systems 

 Arnold–Givental conjecture and Arnold conjecture – relating symplectic geometry to Morse theory.
 Berry–Tabor conjecture in quantum chaos
 Banach's problem – is there an ergodic system with simple Lebesgue spectrum?
 Birkhoff conjecture – if a billiard table is strictly convex and integrable, is its boundary necessarily an ellipse?
 Collatz conjecture (aka the  conjecture)
 Eden's conjecture that the supremum of the local Lyapunov dimensions on the global attractor is achieved on a stationary point or an unstable periodic orbit embedded into the attractor.
 Eremenko's conjecture: every component of the escaping set of an entire transcendental function is unbounded.
 Fatou conjecture that a quadratic family of maps from the complex plane to itself is hyperbolic for an open dense set of parameters.
 Furstenberg conjecture – is every invariant and ergodic measure for the  action on the circle either Lebesgue or atomic?
 Kaplan–Yorke conjecture on the dimension of an attractor in terms of its Lyapunov exponents
 Margulis conjecture – measure classification for diagonalizable actions in higher-rank groups.
 MLC conjecture – is the Mandelbrot set locally connected?
 Many problems concerning an outer billiard, for example showing that outer billiards relative to almost every convex polygon have unbounded orbits.
 Quantum unique ergodicity conjecture on the distribution of large-frequency eigenfunctions of the Laplacian on a negatively-curved manifold
 Rokhlin's multiple mixing problem – are all strongly mixing systems also strongly 3-mixing?
 Weinstein conjecture – does a regular compact contact type level set of a Hamiltonian on a symplectic manifold carry at least one periodic orbit of the Hamiltonian flow?

 Does every positive integer generate a juggler sequence terminating at 1?
 Lyapunov function: Lyapunov's second method for stability – For what classes of ODEs, describing dynamical systems, does the Lyapunov’s second method formulated in the classical and canonically generalized forms define the necessary and sufficient conditions for the (asymptotical) stability of motion?
 Is every reversible cellular automaton in three or more dimensions locally reversible?

Games and puzzles

Combinatorial games

 Is there a non-terminating game of beggar-my-neighbour?
 Sudoku:
 How many puzzles have exactly one solution?
 How many puzzles with exactly one solution are minimal?
 What is the maximum number of givens for a minimal puzzle?
 Tic-tac-toe variants:
Given a width of tic-tac-toe board, what is the smallest dimension such that X is guaranteed a winning strategy?
 What is the Turing completeness status of all unique elementary cellular automata?

Games with imperfect information
 Rendezvous problem

Geometry

Algebraic geometry 

 Abundance conjecture: if the canonical bundle of a projective variety with Kawamata log terminal singularities is nef, then it is semiample.
 Bass conjecture on the finite generation of certain algebraic K-groups.
 Bass–Quillen conjecture relating vector bundles over a regular Noetherian ring and over the polynomial ring .
 Deligne conjecture: any one of numerous named for Pierre Deligne.
 Dixmier conjecture: any endomorphism of a Weyl algebra is an automorphism.
 Fröberg conjecture on the Hilbert functions of a set of forms.
 Fujita conjecture regarding the line bundle  constructed from a positive holomorphic line bundle  on a compact complex manifold  and the canonical line bundle  of 
 General elephant problem: do general elephants have at most Du Val singularities?
 Hartshorne's conjectures
 Jacobian conjecture: if a polynomial mapping over a characteristic-0 field has a constant nonzero Jacobian determinant, then it has a regular (i.e. with polynomial components) inverse function.
 Manin conjecture on the distribution of rational points of bounded height in certain subsets of Fano varieties
 Maulik–Nekrasov–Okounkov–Pandharipande conjecture on an equivalence between Gromov–Witten theory and Donaldson–Thomas theory
 Nagata's conjecture on curves, specifically the minimal degree required for a plane algebraic curve to pass through a collection of very general points with prescribed multiplicities.
 Nakai conjecture: if a complex algebraic variety has a ring of differential operators generated by its contained derivations, then it must be smooth.
 Parshin's conjecture: the higher algebraic K-groups of any smooth projective variety defined over a finite field must vanish up to torsion.
 Standard conjectures on algebraic cycles
 Tate conjecture on the connection between algebraic cycles on algebraic varieties and Galois representations on étale cohomology groups.
 Virasoro conjecture: a certain generating function encoding the Gromov–Witten invariants of a smooth projective variety is fixed by an action of half of the Virasoro algebra.
 Zariski multiplicity conjecture on the topological equisingularity and equimultiplicity of varieties at singular points

 Are infinite sequences of flips possible in dimensions greater than 3?
 Resolution of singularities in characteristic

Covering and packing
 Borsuk's problem on upper and lower bounds for the number of smaller-diameter subsets needed to cover a bounded n-dimensional set.
 The covering problem of Rado: if the union of finitely many axis-parallel squares has unit area, how small can the largest area covered by a disjoint subset of squares be?
 The Erdős–Oler conjecture: when  is a triangular number, packing  circles in an equilateral triangle requires a triangle of the same size as packing  circles
 The kissing number problem for dimensions other than 1, 2, 3, 4, 8 and 24
 Reinhardt's conjecture: the smoothed octagon has the lowest maximum packing density of all centrally-symmetric convex plane sets
 Sphere packing problems, including the density of the densest packing in dimensions other than 1, 2, 3, 8 and 24, and its asymptotic behavior for high dimensions.
 Square packing in a square: what is the asymptotic growth rate of wasted space?
 Ulam's packing conjecture about the identity of the worst-packing convex solid

Differential geometry 

 The spherical Bernstein's problem, a generalization of Bernstein's problem
 Carathéodory conjecture: any convex, closed, and twice-differentiable surface in three-dimensional Euclidean space admits at least two umbilical points.
 Cartan–Hadamard conjecture: can the classical isoperimetric inequality for subsets of Euclidean space be extended to spaces of nonpositive curvature, known as Cartan–Hadamard manifolds?
 Chern's conjecture (affine geometry) that the Euler characteristic of a compact affine manifold vanishes.
 Chern's conjecture for hypersurfaces in spheres, a number of closely-related conjectures.
 Closed curve problem: find (explicit) necessary and sufficient conditions that determine when, given two periodic functions with the same period, the integral curve is closed.
 The filling area conjecture, that a hemisphere has the minimum area among shortcut-free surfaces in Euclidean space whose boundary forms a closed curve of given length
 The Hopf conjectures relating the curvature and Euler characteristic of higher-dimensional Riemannian manifolds
 Yau's conjecture: a closed Riemannian 3-manifold has an infinite number of smooth closed immersed minimal surfaces.

Discrete geometry 

 The big-line-big-clique conjecture on the existence of either many collinear points or many mutually visible points in large planar point sets
 The Hadwiger conjecture on covering n-dimensional convex bodies with at most 2n smaller copies
 Solving the happy ending problem for arbitrary 
Improving lower and upper bounds for the Heilbronn triangle problem.
 Kalai's 3d conjecture on the least possible number of faces of centrally symmetric polytopes.
 The Kobon triangle problem on triangles in line arrangements
 The Kusner conjecture: at most  points can be equidistant in  spaces
 The McMullen problem on projectively transforming sets of points into convex position
Opaque forest problem on finding opaque sets for various planar shapes

 How many unit distances can be determined by a set of  points in the Euclidean plane?

 Finding matching upper and lower bounds for k-sets and halving lines
 Tripod packing: how many tripods can have their apexes packed into a given cube?

Euclidean geometry

 The Atiyah conjecture on configurations on the invertibility of a certain -by- matrix depending on  points in 
 Bellman's lost in a forest problem – find the shortest route that is guaranteed to reach the boundary of a given shape, starting at an unknown point of the shape with unknown orientation
 Borromean rings — are there three unknotted space curves, not all three circles, which cannot be arranged to form this link?
 Danzer's problem and Conway's dead fly problem – do Danzer sets of bounded density or bounded separation exist?
 Dissection into orthoschemes – is it possible for simplices of every dimension?
 Ehrhart's volume conjecture: a convex body  in  dimensions containing a single lattice point in its interior as its center of mass cannot have volume greater than 
 The  – does there exist a two-dimensional shape that forms the prototile for an aperiodic tiling, but not for any periodic tiling?
 The values of the Hermite constants for dimensions other than 1–8 and 24
 Inscribed square problem, also known as Toeplitz' conjecture and the square peg problem – does every Jordan curve have an inscribed square?
 The Kakeya conjecture – do -dimensional sets that contain a unit line segment in every direction necessarily have Hausdorff dimension and Minkowski dimension equal to ?
 The Kelvin problem on minimum-surface-area partitions of space into equal-volume cells, and the optimality of the Weaire–Phelan structure as a solution to the Kelvin problem
 Lebesgue's universal covering problem on the minimum-area convex shape in the plane that can cover any shape of diameter one
 Mahler's conjecture on the product of the volumes of a centrally symmetric convex body and its polar.
 Moser's worm problem – what is the smallest area of a shape that can cover every unit-length curve in the plane?
 The moving sofa problem – what is the largest area of a shape that can be maneuvered through a unit-width L-shaped corridor?
 Does every convex polyhedron have Rupert's property?
 Shephard's problem (a.k.a. Dürer's conjecture) – does every convex polyhedron have a net, or simple edge-unfolding?
 Is there a non-convex polyhedron without self-intersections with more than seven faces, all of which share an edge with each other?
 The Thomson problem – what is the minimum energy configuration of  mutually-repelling particles on a unit sphere?
 Convex uniform 5-polytopes – find and classify the complete set of these shapes

Graph theory

Graph coloring and labeling 

 The 1-factorization conjecture that if  is odd or even and  respectively, then a -regular graph with  vertices is 1-factorable.
 The perfect 1-factorization conjecture that every complete graph on an even number of vertices admits a perfect 1-factorization.
 Cereceda's conjecture on the diameter of the space of colorings of degenerate graphs
 The Earth–Moon problem: what is the maximum chromatic number of biplanar graphs?
 The Erdős–Faber–Lovász conjecture on coloring unions of cliques
 The Gyárfás–Sumner conjecture on χ-boundedness of graphs with a forbidden induced tree
 The Hadwiger conjecture relating coloring to clique minors
 The Hadwiger–Nelson problem on the chromatic number of unit distance graphs
 Jaeger's Petersen-coloring conjecture: every bridgeless cubic graph has a cycle-continuous mapping to the Petersen graph
 The list coloring conjecture: for every graph, the list chromatic index equals the chromatic index
 The overfull conjecture that a graph with maximum degree  is class 2 if and only if it has an overfull subgraph  satisfying .
 The total coloring conjecture of Behzad and Vizing that the total chromatic number is at most two plus the maximum degree

Graph drawing 
 The Albertson conjecture: the crossing number can be lower-bounded by the crossing number of a complete graph with the same chromatic number
 Conway's thrackle conjecture that thrackles cannot have more edges than vertices
 Harborth's conjecture: every planar graph can be drawn with integer edge lengths
 Negami's conjecture on projective-plane embeddings of graphs with planar covers
 The strong Papadimitriou–Ratajczak conjecture: every polyhedral graph has a convex greedy embedding
 Turán's brick factory problem – Is there a drawing of any complete bipartite graph with fewer crossings than the number given by Zarankiewicz?

 Universal point sets of subquadratic size for planar graphs

Paths and cycles in graphs 
 Barnette's conjecture: every cubic bipartite three-connected planar graph has a Hamiltonian cycle
 Gilbert–Pollack conjecture on the Steiner ratio of the Euclidean plane that the Steiner ratio is 
 Chvátal's toughness conjecture, that there is a number  such that every -tough graph is Hamiltonian
 The cycle double cover conjecture: every bridgeless graph has a family of cycles that includes each edge twice
 The Erdős–Gyárfás conjecture on cycles with power-of-two lengths in cubic graphs
 The linear arboricity conjecture on decomposing graphs into disjoint unions of paths according to their maximum degree
 The Lovász conjecture on Hamiltonian paths in symmetric graphs
 The Oberwolfach problem on which 2-regular graphs have the property that a complete graph on the same number of vertices can be decomposed into edge-disjoint copies of the given graph.
 Szymanski's conjecture: every permutation on the -dimensional doubly-directed hypercube graph can be routed with edge-disjoint paths.

Word-representation of graphs 
Are there any graphs on n vertices whose representation requires more than floor(n/2) copies of each letter?
Characterise (non-)word-representable planar graphs
Characterise word-representable graphs in terms of (induced) forbidden subgraphs.
Characterise word-representable near-triangulations containing the complete graph K4 (such a characterisation is known for K4-free planar graphs)
Classify graphs with representation number 3, that is, graphs that can be represented using 3 copies of each letter, but cannot be represented using 2 copies of each letter
Is it true that out of all bipartite graphs, crown graphs require longest word-representants?
Is the line graph of a non-word-representable graph always non-word-representable?
Which (hard) problems on graphs can be translated to words representing them and solved on words (efficiently)?

Miscellaneous graph theory 
 Babai's problem: which groups are Babai invariant groups?
 Brouwer's conjecture on upper bounds for sums of eigenvalues of Laplacians of graphs in terms of their number of edges
 Conway's 99-graph problem: does there exist a strongly regular graph with parameters (99,14,1,2)?
 Degree diameter problem: given two positive integers , what is the largest graph of diameter  such that all vertices have degrees at most ?
 The Erdős–Hajnal conjecture on large cliques or independent sets in graphs with a forbidden induced subgraph
 The GNRS conjecture on whether minor-closed graph families have  embeddings with bounded distortion
 Graham's pebbling conjecture on the pebbling number of Cartesian products of graphs
 The implicit graph conjecture on the existence of implicit representations for slowly-growing hereditary families of graphs
 Jørgensen's conjecture that every 6-vertex-connected K6-minor-free graph is an apex graph
 Meyniel's conjecture that cop number is 
 Does a Moore graph with girth 5 and degree 57 exist?
 What is the largest possible pathwidth of an -vertex cubic graph?
 The reconstruction conjecture and new digraph reconstruction conjecture on whether a graph is uniquely determined by its vertex-deleted subgraphs.
 Ryser's conjecture relating the maximum matching size and minimum transversal size in hypergraphs
 The second neighborhood problem: does every oriented graph contain a vertex for which there are at least as many other vertices at distance two as at distance one?
 Sidorenko's conjecture on homomorphism densities of graphs in graphons
 Do there exist infinitely many strongly regular geodetic graphs, or any strongly regular geodetic graphs that are not Moore graphs?
 Sumner's conjecture: does every -vertex tournament contain as a subgraph every -vertex oriented tree?
 Tutte's conjectures:
 every bridgeless graph has a nowhere-zero 5-flow
 every Petersen-minor-free bridgeless graph has a nowhere-zero 4-flow
 Vizing's conjecture on the domination number of cartesian products of graphs
 Woodall's conjecture that the minimum number of edges in a dicut of a directed graph is equal to the maximum number of disjoint dijoins
 Zarankiewicz problem: how many edges can there be in a bipartite graph on a given number of vertices with no complete bipartite subgraphs of a given size?

Group theory 

 Andrews–Curtis conjecture: every balanced presentation of the trivial group can be transformed into a trivial presentation by a sequence of Nielsen transformations on relators and conjugations of relators
 Guralnick–Thompson conjecture on the composition factors of groups in genus-0 systems
 The inverse Galois problem: is every finite group the Galois group of a Galois extension of the rationals?
 Problems in loop theory and quasigroup theory consider generalizations of groups

 Are there an infinite number of Leinster groups?
 Does generalized moonshine exist?
 For which positive integers m, n is the free Burnside group  finite? In particular, is  finite?
 Is every finitely presented periodic group finite?
 Is every group surjunctive?

Notebook problems 
 The Kourovka Notebook is a collection of unsolved problems in group theory, first published in 1965 and updated many times since.

Model theory and formal languages 

 Generalized star height problem: can all regular languages be expressed using generalized regular expressions with limited nesting depths of Kleene stars?
 For which number fields does Hilbert's tenth problem hold?
 Kueker's conjecture
 The main gap conjecture, e.g. for uncountable first order theories, for AECs, and for -saturated models of a countable theory.
 Shelah's categoricity conjecture for : If a sentence is categorical above the Hanf number then it is categorical in all cardinals above the Hanf number.
 Shelah's eventual categoricity conjecture: For every cardinal  there exists a cardinal  such that if an AEC K with LS(K)<=  is categorical in a cardinal above  then it is categorical in all cardinals above .
 The stable field conjecture: every infinite field with a stable first-order theory is separably closed.
 The stable forking conjecture for simple theories
 Tarski's exponential function problem: is the theory of the real numbers with the exponential function decidable?
 The universality problem for C-free graphs: For which finite sets C of graphs does the class of C-free countable graphs have a universal member under strong embeddings?
 The universality spectrum problem: Is there a first-order theory whose universality spectrum is minimum?

 Assume K is the class of models of a countable first order theory omitting countably many types. If K has a model of cardinality  does it have a model of cardinality continuum?
 Do the Henson graphs have the finite model property?
 Does a finitely presented homogeneous structure for a finite relational language have finitely many reducts?
 Does there exist an o-minimal first order theory with a trans-exponential (rapid growth) function?
 Is every infinite, minimal field of characteristic zero algebraically closed? (Here, "minimal" means that every definable subset of the structure is finite or co-finite.)
 Is the Borel monadic theory of the real order (BMTO) decidable? Is the monadic theory of well-ordering (MTWO) consistently decidable?
 Is the theory of the field of Laurent series over  decidable? of the field of polynomials over ?
 Is there a logic L which satisfies both the Beth property and Δ-interpolation, is compact but does not satisfy the interpolation property?

 Determine the structure of Keisler's order.

Probability theory 

 Ibragimov–Iosifescu conjecture for φ-mixing sequences

Number theory

General 

André–Oort conjecture: is every irreducible component of the Zariski closure of a set of special points in a Shimura variety a special subvariety?
Beilinson's conjectures
 Brocard's problem: are there any integer solutions to  other than ?
 Büchi's problem on sufficiently large sequences of square numbers with constant second difference.
 Carmichael's totient function conjecture: do all values of Euler's totient function have multiplicity greater than ?
 Casas-Alvero conjecture: if a polynomial of degree  defined over a field  of characteristic  has a factor in common with its first through -th derivative, then must  be the -th power of a linear polynomial?
 Catalan–Dickson conjecture on aliquot sequences: no aliquot sequences are infinite but non-repeating.
 Congruent number problem (a corollary to Birch and Swinnerton-Dyer conjecture, per Tunnell's theorem): determine precisely what rational numbers are congruent numbers.
 Erdős–Moser problem: is  the only solution to the Erdős–Moser equation?
 Erdős–Straus conjecture: for every , there are positive integers  such that .
 Erdős–Ulam problem: is there a dense set of points in the plane all at rational distances from one-another?
 Exponent pair conjecture: for all , is the pair  an exponent pair?
 The Gauss circle problem: how far can the number of integer points in a circle centered at the origin be from the area of the circle?
Grand Riemann hypothesis: do the nontrivial zeros of all automorphic L-functions lie on the critical line  with real ?
Generalized Riemann hypothesis: do the nontrivial zeros of all Dirichlet L-functions lie on the critical line  with real ?
Riemann hypothesis: do the nontrivial zeros of the Riemann zeta function lie on the critical line  with real ?
 Grimm's conjecture: each element of a set of consecutive composite numbers can be assigned a distinct prime number that divides it.
 Hardy–Littlewood zeta-function conjectures
 Hilbert–Pólya conjecture: the nontrivial zeros of the Riemann zeta function correspond to eigenvalues of a self-adjoint operator.
 Hilbert's eleventh problem: classify quadratic forms over algebraic number fields.
 Hilbert's ninth problem: find the most general reciprocity law for the norm residues of -th order in a general algebraic number field, where  is a power of a prime. 
 Keating–Snaith conjecture concerning the asymptotics of an integral involving the Riemann zeta function
Lehmer's totient problem: if  divides , must  be prime?
 Leopoldt's conjecture: a p-adic analogue of the regulator of an algebraic number field does not vanish.
 Lindelöf hypothesis that for all , 
 The density hypothesis for zeroes of the Riemann zeta function
 Montgomery's pair correlation conjecture: the normalized pair correlation function between pairs of zeros of the Riemann zeta function is the same as the pair correlation function of random Hermitian matrices.
 n conjecture: a generalization of the abc conjecture to more than three integers.
 abc conjecture: for any ,  is true for only finitely many positive  such that .
 Newman's conjecture: the partition function satisfies any arbitrary congruence infinitely often.
 Pillai's conjecture: for any , the equation  has finitely many solutions when  are not both .
 Piltz divisor problem on bounding 
 Dirichlet's divisor problem: the specific case of the Piltz divisor problem for 
 Ramanujan–Petersson conjecture: a number of related conjectures that are generalizations of the original conjecture.
 Sato–Tate conjecture: also a number of related conjectures that are generalizations of the original conjecture.
 Scholz conjecture: the length of the shortest addition chain producing  is at most  plus the length of the shortest addition chain producing .
 Do Siegel zeros exist?
 Singmaster's conjecture: is there a finite upper bound on the multiplicities of the entries greater than 1 in Pascal's triangle?
 The uniqueness conjecture for Markov numbers that every Markov number is the largest number in exactly one normalized solution to the Markov Diophantine equation.
 Vojta's conjecture on heights of points on algebraic varieties over algebraic number fields.

 Are there infinitely many perfect numbers?
Do any odd perfect numbers exist?
Do quasiperfect numbers exist?
Do any non-power of 2 almost perfect numbers exist?
Are there 65, 66, or 67 idoneal numbers?
 Are there any pairs of amicable numbers which have opposite parity?
 Are there any pairs of betrothed numbers which have same parity?
 Are there any pairs of relatively prime amicable numbers?
 Are there infinitely many amicable numbers?
 Are there infinitely many betrothed numbers?
 Are there infinitely many Giuga numbers?
 Does every rational number with an odd denominator have an odd greedy expansion?
 Do any Lychrel numbers exist?
 Do any odd noncototients exist?
 Do any odd weird numbers exist?
 Do any (2, 5)-perfect numbers extst?
 Do any Taxicab(5, 2, n) exist for n > 1?
 Is there a covering system with odd distinct moduli?
 Is  a normal number (i.e., is each digit 0–9 equally frequent)?
 Is 10 a solitary number?
 Can a 3×3 magic square be constructed from 9 distinct perfect square numbers?
 Which integers can be written as the sum of three perfect cubes?
 Can every integer be written as a sum of four perfect cubes?

 Find the value of the De Bruijn–Newman constant.

Additive number theory 

 Beal's conjecture: for all integral solutions to  where , all three numbers  must share some prime factor.
 Erdős conjecture on arithmetic progressions that if the sum of the reciprocals of the members of a set of positive integers diverges, then the set contains arbitrarily long arithmetic progressions.
 Erdős–Turán conjecture on additive bases: if  is an additive basis of order , then the number of ways that positive integers  can be expressed as the sum of two numbers in  must tend to infinity as  tends to infinity.
 Fermat–Catalan conjecture: there are finitely many distinct solutions  to the equation  with  being positive coprime integers and  being positive integers satisfying .
 Gilbreath's conjecture on consecutive applications of the unsigned forward difference operator to the sequence of prime numbers.
 Lander, Parkin, and Selfridge conjecture: if the sum of  -th powers of positive integers is equal to a different sum of  -th powers of positive integers, then .
 Lemoine's conjecture: all odd integers greater than  can be represented as the sum of an odd prime number and an even semiprime.
 Minimum overlap problem of estimating the minimum possible maximum number of times a number appears in the termwise difference of two equally large sets partitioning the set 
 Pollock's conjectures
 Does every nonnegative integer appear in Recamán's sequence?
 Skolem problem: can an algorithm determine if a constant-recursive sequence contains a zero?
 The values of g(k) and G(k) in Waring's problem

 Do the Ulam numbers have a positive density?

 Determine growth rate of rk(N) (see Szemerédi's theorem)

Algebraic number theory 

 Class number problem: are there infinitely many real quadratic number fields with unique factorization?
 Fontaine–Mazur conjecture: actually numerous conjectures, all proposed by Jean-Marc Fontaine and Barry Mazur.
 Gan–Gross–Prasad conjecture: a restriction problem in representation theory of real or p-adic Lie groups.
 Greenberg's conjectures
 Kummer–Vandiver conjecture: primes  do not divide the class number of the maximal real subfield of the -th cyclotomic field.
 Lang and Trotter's conjecture on supersingular primes that the number of supersingular primes less than a constant  is within a constant multiple of 
 Selberg's 1/4 conjecture: the eigenvalues of the Laplace operator on Maass wave forms of congruence subgroups are at least .
 Stark conjectures (including Brumer–Stark conjecture)

 Characterize all algebraic number fields that have some power basis.

Computational number theory

 Can integer factorization be done in polynomial time?

Prime numbers 

 Agoh–Giuga conjecture on the Bernoulli numbers that  is prime if and only if 
 Artin's conjecture on primitive roots that if an integer is neither a perfect square nor , then it is a primitive root modulo infinitely many prime numbers 
 Bunyakovsky conjecture: if an integer-coefficient polynomial  has a positive leading coefficient, is irreducible over the integers, and has no common factors over all  where  is a positive integer, then  is prime infinitely often.
 Catalan's Mersenne conjecture: some Catalan–Mersenne number is composite and thus all Catalan–Mersenne numbers are composite after some point.
 Dickson's conjecture: for a finite set of linear forms  with each , there are infinitely many  for which all forms are prime, unless there is some congruence condition preventing it.
 Elliott–Halberstam conjecture on the distribution of prime numbers in arithmetic progressions.
 Erdős–Mollin–Walsh conjecture: no three consecutive numbers are all powerful.
 Fortune's conjecture that no Fortunate number is composite.
 The Gaussian moat problem: is it possible to find an infinite sequence of distinct Gaussian prime numbers such that the difference between consecutive numbers in the sequence is bounded?
 Gillies' conjecture on the distribution of prime divisors of Mersenne numbers.
 Landau's problems
 Problems associated to Linnik's theorem
 Polignac's conjecture: for all positive even numbers , there are infinitely many prime gaps of size .
 Selfridge's conjecture: is 78,557 the lowest Sierpiński number?
 Twin prime conjecture: there are infinitely many twin primes.
 Does the converse of Wolstenholme's theorem hold for all natural numbers?

 Are all Euclid numbers square-free?
 Are all Fermat numbers square-free?
 Are all Mersenne numbers of prime index square-free?
 Are there any composite c satisfying 2c − 1 ≡ 1 (mod c2)?
 Are there any Wall–Sun–Sun primes?
 Are there any Wieferich primes in base 47?
 Are there infinitely many balanced primes?
 Are there infinitely many Carol primes?
 Are there infinitely many cluster primes?
 Are there infinitely many cousin primes?
 Are there infinitely many Cullen primes?
 Are there infinitely many Euclid primes?
 Are there infinitely many Fibonacci primes?
 Are there infinitely many Kummer primes?
 Are there infinitely many Kynea primes?
 Are there infinitely many Lucas primes?
 Are there infinitely many Mersenne primes (Lenstra–Pomerance–Wagstaff conjecture); equivalently, infinitely many even perfect numbers?
 Are there infinitely many Newman–Shanks–Williams primes?
 Are there infinitely many palindromic primes to every base?
 Are there infinitely many Pell primes?
 Are there infinitely many Pierpont primes?
 Are there infinitely many prime quadruplets?
 Are there infinitely many prime triplets?
 Are there infinitely many regular primes, and if so is their relative density ?
 Are there infinitely many sexy primes?
 Are there infinitely many safe and Sophie Germain primes?
 Are there infinitely many Wagstaff primes?
 Are there infinitely many Wieferich primes?
 Are there infinitely many Wilson primes?
 Are there infinitely many Wolstenholme primes?
 Are there infinitely many Woodall primes?
 Can a prime p satisfy  and  simultaneously?
 Does every prime number appear in the Euclid–Mullin sequence?
 Find the smallest Skewes' number
 For any given integer a > 0, are there infinitely many Lucas–Wieferich primes associated with the pair (a, −1)? (Specially, when a = 1, this is the Fibonacci-Wieferich primes, and when a = 2, this is the Pell-Wieferich primes)
 For any given integer a > 0, are there infinitely many primes p such that ap − 1 ≡ 1 (mod p2)?
 For any given integer a which is not a square and does not equal to −1, are there infinitely many primes with a as a primitive root?
 For any given integer b which is not a perfect power and not of the form −4k4 for integer k, are there infinitely many repunit primes to base b?
 Is every Fermat number  composite for ?
 Is 509,203 the lowest Riesel number?

Set theory 

Note: These conjectures are about models of Zermelo-Frankel set theory with choice, and may not be able to be expressed in models of other set theories such as the various constructive set theories or non-wellfounded set theory.
 (Woodin) Does the generalized continuum hypothesis below a strongly compact cardinal imply the generalized continuum hypothesis everywhere?
 Does the generalized continuum hypothesis entail  for every singular cardinal ?
 Does the generalized continuum hypothesis imply the existence of an ℵ2-Suslin tree?
The best bound, ℵω4, was obtained by Shelah using his PCF theory.
 The problem of finding the ultimate core model, one that contains all large cardinals.
 Woodin's Ω-conjecture: if there is a proper class of Woodin cardinals, then Ω-logic satisfies an analogue of Gödel's completeness theorem.

 Does the consistency of the existence of a strongly compact cardinal imply the consistent existence of a supercompact cardinal?
 Does there exist a Jónsson algebra on ℵω?
 Is OCA (the open coloring axiom) consistent with ?
 Without assuming the axiom of choice, can a nontrivial elementary embedding V→V exist?

Topology

 Baum–Connes conjecture: the assembly map is an isomorphism.
 Berge conjecture that the only knots in the 3-sphere which admit lens space surgeries are Berge knots.
 Bing–Borsuk conjecture: every -dimensional homogeneous absolute neighborhood retract is a topological manifold.
 Borel conjecture: aspherical closed manifolds are determined up to homeomorphism by their fundamental groups.
 Halperin conjecture on rational Serre spectral sequences of certain fibrations.
 Hilbert–Smith conjecture: if a locally compact topological group has a continuous, faithful group action on a topological manifold, then the group must be a Lie group.
 Mazur's conjectures
 Novikov conjecture on the homotopy invariance of certain polynomials in the Pontryagin classes of a manifold, arising from the fundamental group.
 Quadrisecants of wild knots: it has been conjectured that wild knots always have infinitely many quadrisecants.
 Telescope conjecture: the last of Ravenel's conjectures in stable homotopy theory to be resolved.
 Unknotting problem: can unknots be recognized in polynomial time?
 Volume conjecture relating quantum invariants of knots to the hyperbolic geometry of their knot complements.
 Whitehead conjecture: every connected subcomplex of a two-dimensional aspherical CW complex is aspherical.
 Zeeman conjecture: given a finite contractible two-dimensional CW complex , is the space  collapsible?

Problems solved since 1995

Algebra
 Suita conjecture (Qi'an Guan and Xiangyu Zhou, 2015) 
 Torsion conjecture (Loïc Merel, 1996)
 Carlitz–Wan conjecture (Hendrik Lenstra, 1995)

Analysis
 Kadison–Singer problem (Adam Marcus, Daniel Spielman and Nikhil Srivastava, 2013) (and the Feichtinger's conjecture, Anderson’s paving conjectures, Weaver’s discrepancy theoretic  and  conjectures, Bourgain-Tzafriri conjecture and -conjecture)
 Ahlfors measure conjecture (Ian Agol, 2004)
 Gradient conjecture (Krzysztof Kurdyka, Tadeusz Mostowski, Adam Parusinski, 1999)

Combinatorics
 Erdős sumset conjecture (Joel Moreira, Florian Richter, Donald Robertson, 2018)
 McMullen's g-conjecture on the possible numbers of faces of different dimensions in a simplicial sphere (also Grünbaum conjecture, several conjectures of Kühnel) (Karim Adiprasito, 2018)
 Hirsch conjecture (Francisco Santos Leal, 2010)
 Gessel's lattice path conjecture (Manuel Kauers, Christoph Koutschan, and Doron Zeilberger, 2009)
 Stanley–Wilf conjecture (Gábor Tardos and Adam Marcus, 2004) (and also the Alon–Friedgut conjecture)
 Kemnitz's conjecture (Christian Reiher, 2003, Carlos di Fiore, 2003)
 Cameron–Erdős conjecture (Ben J. Green, 2003, Alexander Sapozhenko, 2003)

Dynamical systems
 Zimmer's conjecture (Aaron Brown, David Fisher, and Sebastián Hurtado-Salazar, 2017)
 Painlevé conjecture (Jinxin Xue, 2014)

Game theory
 The angel problem (Various independent proofs, 2006)

Geometry

21st century
 Maximal rank conjecture (Eric Larson, 2018)
 Weibel's conjecture (Moritz Kerz, Florian Strunk, and Georg Tamme, 2018)
 Yau's conjecture (Antoine Song, 2018)
 Pentagonal tiling (Michaël Rao, 2017)
 Willmore conjecture (Fernando Codá Marques and André Neves, 2012)
 Erdős distinct distances problem (Larry Guth, Nets Hawk Katz, 2011)
 Heterogeneous tiling conjecture (squaring the plane) (Frederick V. Henle and James M. Henle, 2008)
 Tameness conjecture (Ian Agol, 2004)
 Ending lamination theorem (Jeffrey F. Brock, Richard D. Canary, Yair N. Minsky, 2004)
 Carpenter's rule problem (Robert Connelly, Erik Demaine, Günter Rote, 2003)
 Lambda g conjecture (Carel Faber and Rahul Pandharipande, 2003)
 Nagata's conjecture (Ivan Shestakov, Ualbai Umirbaev, 2003)
 Double bubble conjecture (Michael Hutchings, Frank Morgan, Manuel Ritoré, Antonio Ros, 2002)

20th century
 Honeycomb conjecture (Thomas Callister Hales, 1999)
 Lange's conjecture (Montserrat Teixidor i Bigas and Barbara Russo, 1999)
 Bogomolov conjecture (Emmanuel Ullmo, 1998, Shou-Wu Zhang, 1998)
 Kepler conjecture (Samuel Ferguson, Thomas Callister Hales, 1998)
 Dodecahedral conjecture (Thomas Callister Hales, Sean McLaughlin, 1998)

Graph theory
 Kahn–Kalai conjecture (Jinyoung Park and Huy Tuan Pham, 2022)
 Blankenship–Oporowski conjecture on the book thickness of subdivisions (Vida Dujmović, David Eppstein, Robert Hickingbotham, Pat Morin, and David Wood, 2021)
Ringel's conjecture on graceful labeling of trees (Richard Montgomery, Benny Sudakov, Alexey Pokrovskiy, 2020)
Disproof of Hedetniemi's conjecture on the chromatic number of tensor products of graphs (Yaroslav Shitov, 2019)
 Kelmans–Seymour conjecture (Dawei He, Yan Wang, and Xingxing Yu, 2020)
 Goldberg–Seymour conjecture (Guantao Chen, Guangming Jing, and Wenan Zang, 2019)
 Babai's problem (Alireza Abdollahi, Maysam Zallaghi, 2015)
 Alspach's conjecture (Darryn Bryant, Daniel Horsley, William Pettersson, 2014)
 Alon–Saks–Seymour conjecture (Hao Huang, Benny Sudakov, 2012)
 Read–Hoggar conjecture (June Huh, 2009)
 Scheinerman's conjecture (Jeremie Chalopin and Daniel Gonçalves, 2009)
 Erdős–Menger conjecture (Ron Aharoni, Eli Berger 2007)
 Road coloring conjecture (Avraham Trahtman, 2007)
 Robertson–Seymour theorem (Neil Robertson, Paul Seymour, 2004)
 Strong perfect graph conjecture (Maria Chudnovsky, Neil Robertson, Paul Seymour and Robin Thomas, 2002)
 Toida's conjecture (Mikhail Muzychuk, Mikhail Klin, and Reinhard Pöschel, 2001)
 Harary's conjecture on the integral sum number of complete graphs (Zhibo Chen, 1996)

Group theory
 Hanna Neumann conjecture (Joel Friedman, 2011, Igor Mineyev, 2011)
 Density theorem (Hossein Namazi, Juan Souto, 2010)
 Full classification of finite simple groups (Koichiro Harada, Ronald Solomon, 2008)

Number theory

21st century
Duffin-Schaeffer conjecture (Dimitris Koukoulopoulos, James Maynard, 2019)
 Main conjecture in Vinogradov's mean-value theorem (Jean Bourgain, Ciprian Demeter, Larry Guth, 2015)
 Goldbach's weak conjecture (Harald Helfgott, 2013)
Existence of bounded gaps between primes (Yitang Zhang, Polymath8, James Maynard, 2013)
 Sidon set problem (Javier Cilleruelo, Imre Z. Ruzsa, and Carlos Vinuesa, 2010)
 Serre's modularity conjecture (Chandrashekhar Khare and Jean-Pierre Wintenberger, 2008)
 Green–Tao theorem (Ben J. Green and Terence Tao, 2004)
 Catalan's conjecture (Preda Mihăilescu, 2002)
 Erdős–Graham problem (Ernest S. Croot III, 2000)

20th century
 Lafforgue's theorem (Laurent Lafforgue, 1998)
 Fermat's Last Theorem (Andrew Wiles and Richard Taylor, 1995)

Ramsey theory
 Burr–Erdős conjecture (Choongbum Lee, 2017)
 Boolean Pythagorean triples problem (Marijn Heule, Oliver Kullmann, Victor W. Marek, 2016)

Theoretical computer science
Sensitivity conjecture for Boolean functions (Hao Huang, 2019)

Topology
Deciding whether the Conway knot is a slice knot (Lisa Piccirillo, 2020)
 Virtual Haken conjecture (Ian Agol, Daniel Groves, Jason Manning, 2012) (and by work of Daniel Wise also virtually fibered conjecture)
 Hsiang–Lawson's conjecture (Simon Brendle, 2012)
 Ehrenpreis conjecture (Jeremy Kahn, Vladimir Markovic, 2011)
 Atiyah conjecture for groups with finite subgroups of unbounded order (Austin, 2009)
 Cobordism hypothesis (Jacob Lurie, 2008)
 Spherical space form conjecture (Grigori Perelman, 2006)
 Poincaré conjecture (Grigori Perelman, 2002)
 Geometrization conjecture, (Grigori Perelman, series of preprints in 2002–2003)
 Nikiel's conjecture (Mary Ellen Rudin, 1999)
 Disproof of the Ganea conjecture (Iwase, 1997)

Uncategorised

2010s
 Erdős discrepancy problem (Terence Tao, 2015)
 Umbral moonshine conjecture (John F. R. Duncan, Michael J. Griffin, Ken Ono, 2015)
 Anderson conjecture on the finite number of diffeomorphism classes of the collection of 4-manifolds satisfying certain properties (Jeff Cheeger, Aaron Naber, 2014)
 Gaussian correlation inequality (Thomas Royen, 2014)
 Beck's conjecture on discrepancies of set systems constructed from three permutations (Alantha Newman, Aleksandar Nikolov, 2011)
 Bloch–Kato conjecture (Vladimir Voevodsky, 2011) (and Quillen–Lichtenbaum conjecture and by work of Thomas Geisser and Marc Levine (2001) also Beilinson–Lichtenbaum conjecture)

2000s
 Kauffman–Harary conjecture (Thomas Mattman, Pablo Solis, 2009)
 Surface subgroup conjecture (Jeremy Kahn, Vladimir Markovic, 2009)
 Normal scalar curvature conjecture and the Böttcher–Wenzel conjecture (Zhiqin Lu, 2007)
 Nirenberg–Treves conjecture (Nils Dencker, 2005)
 Lax conjecture (Adrian Lewis, Pablo Parrilo, Motakuri Ramana, 2005)
 The Langlands–Shelstad fundamental lemma (Ngô Bảo Châu and Gérard Laumon, 2004)
 Milnor conjecture (Vladimir Voevodsky, 2003)
 Kirillov's conjecture (Ehud Baruch, 2003)
 Kouchnirenko’s conjecture (Bertrand Haas, 2002)
 n! conjecture (Mark Haiman, 2001) (and also Macdonald positivity conjecture)
 Kato's conjecture (Pascal Auscher, Steve Hofmann, Michael Lacey, Alan McIntosh, and Philipp Tchamitchian, 2001)
 Deligne's conjecture on 1-motives (Luca Barbieri-Viale, Andreas Rosenschon, Morihiko Saito, 2001)
 Modularity theorem (Christophe Breuil, Brian Conrad, Fred Diamond, and Richard Taylor, 2001)
 Erdős–Stewart conjecture (Florian Luca, 2001)
 Berry–Robbins problem (Michael Atiyah, 2000)

See also 
 List of conjectures
 List of unsolved problems in statistics
 List of unsolved problems in computer science
 List of unsolved problems in physics
 Lists of unsolved problems
 Open Problems in Mathematics
 The Great Mathematical Problems
Scottish Book

References

Further reading

Books discussing problems solved since 1995

Books discussing unsolved problems

External links 
 24 Unsolved Problems and Rewards for them
 List of links to unsolved problems in mathematics, prizes and research
 Open Problem Garden
 AIM Problem Lists
 Unsolved Problem of the Week Archive. MathPro Press.
 
 
 
 Unsolved Problems in Number Theory, Logic and Cryptography
 200 open problems in graph theory
 The Open Problems Project (TOPP), discrete and computational geometry problems
 Kirby's list of unsolved problems in low-dimensional topology
 Erdös' Problems on Graphs
 Unsolved Problems in Virtual Knot Theory and Combinatorial Knot Theory
 Open problems from the 12th International Conference on Fuzzy Set Theory and Its Applications
 List of open problems in inner model theory
 
 Barry Simon's 15 Problems in Mathematical Physics

 

 
Mathematics
Mathematics-related lists